The Northern Crusades or Baltic Crusades were Christian colonization and Christianization campaigns undertaken by Catholic Christian military orders and kingdoms, primarily against the pagan  Baltic, Finnic and West Slavic peoples around the southern and eastern shores of the Baltic Sea, and to a lesser extent  also against Orthodox Christian Slavs (East Slavs).

The most notable campaigns were the Livonian and Prussian crusades. Some of these wars were called crusades during the Middle Ages, but others, including most of the Swedish ones, were first dubbed crusades by 19th-century romantic nationalist historians. However, crusades against Estonians, but also against 'other pagans in those parts' were authorized by Pope Alexander III in the bull Non parum animus noster, in 1171 or 1172.

Background
At the outset of the northern crusades, Christian monarchs across northern Europe commissioned forays into territories that comprise modern-day Estonia, Finland, Latvia, Lithuania, Poland, and Russia. The indigenous populations of Pagans and Eastern Orthodox Christians suffered forced baptisms and the ravages of military occupation. Spearheading, but by no means monopolizing these incursions, the ascendant Teutonic Order profited immensely from the crusades, as did German merchants who fanned out along trading routes traversing the Baltic frontier.
The official starting point for the Northern Crusades was Pope Celestine III's call in 1195, but the Catholic kingdoms of Scandinavia, Poland and the Holy Roman Empire had begun moving to subjugate their pagan neighbors even earlier. The non-Christian people who were objects of the campaigns at various dates included:
 the Polabian Wends, Sorbs, and Obotrites between the Elbe and Oder rivers (by the Saxons, Danes, and Poles, beginning with the Wendish Crusade in 1147)
 the Finns proper in the 1150s in the First Crusade by the Swedes; by the Danes in 1191 and 1202; Tavastia in 1249 in the Second Crusade by the Swedes; and Karelia in 1293 in the Third Crusade by the Swedes; Christianization in these areas had started earlier.
 Livonians, Latgallians, Selonians, and Estonians (by the Germans and Danes, 1193–1227).
 Semigallians and Curonians (1219–1290).
 Old Prussians.
 Lithuanians and Samogitians (by the Germans, unsuccessfully, 1236–1410).

Armed conflict between the Finnic peoples, Balts and Slavs who dwelt by the Baltic shores and their Saxon and Danish neighbors to the north and south had been common for several centuries before the crusade. The previous battles had largely been caused by attempts to destroy castles and sea trade routes to gain an economic advantage in the region, and the crusade basically continued this pattern of conflict, albeit now inspired and prescribed by the Pope and undertaken by Papal knights and armed monks.

Wendish Crusade

The campaigns started with the 1147 Wendish Crusade against the Polabian Slavs (or "Wends") of what is now northern and eastern Germany. The crusade occurred parallel to the Second Crusade to the Holy Land, and continued irregularly until the 16th century.

Swedish Crusades

The Swedish crusades were campaigns by Sweden against Finns, Tavastians and Karelians during period from 1150 to 1293.

Danish Crusades 

The Danes are known to have made at least three crusades to Finland. First mention of these crusades is from 1187 when crusader Esbern Snare mentioned in his Christmas feast speech a major victory from the Finns. Two next known crusades were made in 1191 and in 1202. The latter one was led by the Bishop of Lund, Anders Sunesen, with his brother.

Livonian Crusade

By the 12th century, the peoples inhabiting the lands now known as Estonia, Latvia and Lithuania formed a pagan wedge between increasingly powerful rival Christian states – the Orthodox Church to their east and the Catholic Church to their west. The difference in creeds was one of the reasons they had not yet been effectively converted. During a period of more than 150 years leading up to the arrival of German crusaders in the region, Estonia was attacked thirteen times by Russian principalities, and by Denmark and Sweden as well. Estonians for their part made raids upon Denmark and Sweden. There were peaceful attempts by some Catholics to convert the Estonians, starting with missions dispatched by Adalbert, Archbishop of Bremen in 1045–1072. However, these peaceful efforts seem to have had limited success.

Campaign against the Livonians (1198–1212)
Moving in the wake of German merchants who were now following the old trading routes of the Vikings, a monk named Meinhard landed at the mouth of the Daugava river in present-day Latvia in 1180 and was made bishop in 1186. Pope Celestine III proclaimed a crusade against the Baltic heathens in 1195, which was reiterated by Pope Innocent III and a crusading expedition led by Meinhard's successor, Bishop Berthold of Hanover, landed in Livonia (part of present-day Latvia, surrounding the Gulf of Riga) in 1198. Although the crusaders won their first battle, Bishop Berthold was mortally wounded and the crusaders were repulsed.

In 1199, Albert of Buxhoeveden was appointed by the Archbishop Hartwig II of Bremen to Christianise the Baltic countries. By the time Albert died 30 years later, the conquest and formal Christianisation of present-day Estonia and northern Latvia was complete. Albert began his task by touring the Empire, preaching a Crusade against the Baltic countries, and was assisted in this by a papal bull which declared that fighting against the Baltic heathens was of the same rank as participating in a crusade to the Holy Land. Although he landed in the mouth of the Daugava in 1200 with only 23 ships and 500 soldiers, the bishop's efforts ensured that a constant flow of recruits followed. The first crusaders usually arrived to fight during the spring and returned to their homes in the autumn. To ensure a permanent military presence, the Livonian Brothers of the Sword were founded in 1202. The founding by Bishop Albert of the market at Riga in 1201 attracted citizens from the Empire and economic prosperity ensued. At Albert's request, Pope Innocent III dedicated the Baltic countries to the Virgin Mary to popularize recruitment to his army and the name "Mary's Land" has survived up to modern times. This is noticeable in one of the names given to Livonia at the time, Terra Mariana (Land of Mary).

In 1206, the crusaders subdued the Livonian stronghold in Turaida on the right bank of Gauja River, the ancient trading route to the Northwestern Rus. In order to gain control over the left bank of Gauja, the stone castle was built in Sigulda before 1210. By 1211, the Livonian province of Metsepole (now Limbaži district) and the mixed Livonian-Latgallian inhabited county of Idumea (now Straupe) was converted to the Roman Catholic faith. The last battle against the Livonians was the siege of Satezele hillfort near to Sigulda in 1212. The Livonians, who had been paying tribute to the East Slavic Principality of Polotsk, had at first considered the Germans as useful allies. The first prominent Livonian to be christened was their leader Caupo of Turaida. As the German grip tightened, the Livonians rebelled against the crusaders and the christened chief but were put down. Caupo of Turaida remained an ally of the crusaders until his death in the Battle of St. Matthew's Day in 1217.

The German crusaders enlisted newly baptised Livonian warriors to participate in their campaigns against Latgallians and Selonians (1208–1209), Estonians (1208–1227) and against Semigallians, Samogitians and Curonians (1219–1290).

Campaign against the Latgallians and Selonians (1208–1224)
After the subjugation of the Livonians, the crusaders turned their attention to the Latgallian principalities to the east, along the Gauja and Daugava rivers. The military alliance in 1208 and later conversion from Greek Orthodoxy to Roman Catholicism of the Principality of Tālava was the only peaceful subjugation of the Baltic tribes during the Nordic crusades. The ruler of Tālava, Tālivaldis (Talibaldus de Tolowa), became the most loyal ally of German crusaders against the Estonians, and he died a Catholic martyr in 1215. The war against the Latgallian and Selonian countries along the Daugava waterway started in 1208 by the occupation of the Orthodox Principality of Koknese and the Selonian Sēlpils hillfort. The campaign continued in 1209 with an attack on the Orthodox Principality of Jersika (known as Lettia), accused by crusaders of being in alliance with Lithuanian pagans. After the defeat, the king of Jersika, Visvaldis, became the vassal of the Bishop of Livonia and received part of his country (Southern Latgale) as a fiefdom. The Selonian stronghold of Sēlpils was briefly the seat of a Selonian diocese (1218–1226), and then came under the rule of the Livonian Order (and eventually the stone castle of Selburg was built in its place). Only in 1224, with the division of Tālava and Adzele counties between the Bishop of Riga and the Order of the Swordbearers, did Latgallian countries finally become the possession of German conquerors. The territory of the former Principality of Jersika was divided by the Bishop of Riga and the Livonian Order in 1239.

Campaign against the Estonians (1208–1224)

By 1208, the Germans were strong enough to begin operations against the Estonians, who were at that time divided into eight major and several smaller counties led by elders with limited cooperation between them. In 1208–27, war parties of the different sides rampaged through the Livonian, Northern Latgallian, and Estonian counties, with Livonians and Latgallians normally as allies of the Crusaders, and the Principalities of Polotsk and Pskov appearing as allies of different sides at different times. Hillforts, which were the key centres of Estonian counties, were besieged and captured a number of times. A truce between the war-weary sides was established for three years (1213–1215) and proved generally more favourable to the Germans, who consolidated their political position, while the Estonians were unable to develop their system of loose alliances into a centralised state. The Livonian leader Kaupo was killed in battle near Viljandi (Fellin) on 21 September 1217, but the battle was a crushing defeat for the Estonians, whose leader Lembitu was also killed. Since 1211, his name had come to the attention of the German chroniclers as a notable Estonian elder, and he had become the central figure of the Estonian resistance.

The Christian kingdoms of Denmark and Sweden were also greedy for conquests on the Eastern shores of the Baltic. While the Swedes made only one failed foray into western Estonia in 1220, the Danish Fleet headed by King Valdemar II of Denmark had landed at the Estonian town of Lindanisse (present-day Tallinn) in 1219. After the Battle of Lindanise the Danes established a fortress, which was besieged by Estonians in 1220 and 1223 but held out. Eventually, the whole of northern Estonia came under Danish control.

Wars against Saaremaa (1206–1261)
The last Estonian county to hold out against the invaders was the island county of Saaremaa (Ösel), whose war fleets had raided Denmark and Sweden during the years of fighting against the German crusaders.

In 1206, a Danish army led by the king Valdemar II and Andreas, the Bishop of Lund landed on Saaremaa and attempted to establish a stronghold without success. In 1216 the Livonian Brothers of the Sword and the bishop Theodorich joined forces and invaded Saaremaa over the frozen sea. In return, the Oeselians raided the territories in Latvia that were under German rule the following spring. In 1220, the Swedish army led by king John I of Sweden and the bishop Karl of Linköping conquered Lihula in Rotalia in Western Estonia. Oeselians attacked the Swedish stronghold the same year, conquered it and killed the entire Swedish garrison including the Bishop of Linköping.

In 1222, the Danish king Valdemar II attempted the second conquest of Saaremaa, this time establishing a stone fortress housing a strong garrison. The Danish stronghold was besieged and surrendered within five days, the Danish garrison returned to Revel, leaving bishop Albert of Riga's brother Theodoric, and few others, behind as hostages for peace. The castle was razed to the ground by the Oeselians.

A 20,000 strong army under Papal legate William of Modena crossed the frozen sea while the Saaremaa fleet was icebound, in January 1227. After the surrender of two major Oeselian strongholds, Muhu and Valjala, the Oeselians formally accepted Christianity.

In 1236, after the defeat of the Livonian Brothers of the Sword in the Battle of Saule, military action on Saaremaa broke out again. In 1261, warfare continued as the Oeselians had once more renounced Christianity and killed all the Germans on the island. A peace treaty was signed after the united forces of the Livonian Order, the Bishopric of Ösel-Wiek, and Danish Estonia, including mainland Estonians and Latvians, defeated the Oeselians by conquering their stronghold at Kaarma. Soon thereafter, the Livonian Order established a stone fort at Pöide.

Wars against the Curonians and Semigallians (1201–1290)
Although the Curonians had attacked Riga in 1201 and 1210, Albert of Buxhoeveden, considering Courland a tributary of Valdemar II of Denmark, had been reluctant to conduct a large scale campaign against them. After Albert's death in 1229, the crusaders secured the peaceful submission of Vanemane (a county with a mixed Livonian, Oselian, and Curonian population in the northeastern part of Courland) by treaty in 1230. In the same year, the papal vice-legat Baldouin of Alnea annulled this agreement and concluded an agreement with the ruler (rex) of Bandava in the central Courland Lammekinus, delivering his kingdom into the hands of the papacy. Baldouin became the popes's delegate in Courland and bishop of Semigallia; however, the Germans complained about him to the Roman Curia, and in 1234 Pope Gregory IX removed Baldouin as his delegate.

After their decisive defeat in the Battle of Saule by the Samogitians and Semigallians, the remnants of the Swordbrothers were reorganized in 1237 as a subdivision of the Teutonic Order, and became known as the Livonian Order. In 1242, under the leadership of the master of the Livonian Order Andrew of Groningen, the crusaders began the military conquest of Courland. They defeated the Curonians as far south as Embūte, near the contemporary border with Lithuania, and founded their main fortress at Kuldīga. In 1245 Pope Innocent IV allotted two-thirds of conquered Courland to the Livonian Order, and one third to the Bishopric of Courland.

At the Battle of Durbe in 1260 a force of Samogitians and Curonians overpowered the united forces of the Livonian and Teutonic Orders; over the following years, however, the Crusaders gradually subjugated the Curonians, and in 1267 concluded the peace treaty stipulating the obligations and the rights of their defeated rivals. The unconquered southern parts of their territories (Ceklis and Megava) were united under the rule of the Grand Duchy of Lithuania.

The conquest of Semigallian counties started in 1219 when crusaders from Riga occupied Mežotne, the major port on the Lielupe waterway, and founded the Bishopric of Semigallia. After several unsuccessful campaigns against the pagan Semigallian duke Viestards and his Samogitian kinsfolk, the Roman Curia decided in 1251 to abolish the Bishopric of Semigallia, and divided its territories between the Bishopric of Riga and the Order of Livonia. In 1265 a stone castle was built at Jelgava, on the Lielupe, and became the main military base for crusader attacks against the Semigallians. In 1271 the capital hillfort of Tērvete was conquered, but Semigallians under the Duke Nameisis rebelled in 1279, and the Lithuanians under Traidenis defeated Livonian Order forces in the Battle of Aizkraukle. Duke Nameisis' warriors unsuccessfully attacked Riga in 1280, in response to which around 14,000 crusaders besieged Turaida castle in 1281. To conquer the remaining Semigallian hillforts the Order's master Villekin of Endorpe built a castle called Heiligenberg right next to the Tērvete castle in 1287. The same year the Semigallians made another attempt to conquer Riga, but again failed to take it. On their return home, Livonian knights attacked them, but were defeated at the Battle of Garoza, in which the Orders' master Villekin and at least 35 knights lost their lives. The new master of the Order Konrad von Hattstein organised the last campaigns against the Semigallians in 1289 and 1290; the hillforts of Dobele, Rakte and Sidabre were conquered and most of the Semigallian warriors joined the Samogitian and Lithuanian forces.

Prussia and Lithuania

Campaigns of Bolesław the Curly and Konrad of Masovia 
From 1147 the Polish Duke of Mazovia, Boleslaw the Curly, led many expeditions against pagan Prussia, some of them were successful and the conquest of parts of the Prussian territories.

Konrad I, the Polish Duke of Masovia, unsuccessfully attempted to conquer pagan Prussia in crusades in 1219 and 1222. Taking the advice of the first Bishop of Prussia, Christian of Oliva, Konrad founded the crusading Order of Dobrzyń (or Dobrin) in 1220. However, this order was largely ineffective, and Konrad's campaigns against the Old Prussians were answered by incursions into the already captured territory of Culmerland (Chełmno Land). Subjected to constant Prussian counter-raids, Konrad wanted to stabilize the north of the Duchy of Masovia in this fight over the border area of Chełmno Land. Masovia became part of Poland in the 10th century but native Prussians, Yotvingians, and Lithuanians were still living in the territories north of Masovia, where no settled borders existed. Konrad's military weakness led him in 1226 to ask the Roman Catholic monastic order of the Teutonic Knights to come to Prussia and suppress the Old Prussians.

Campaigns of Bolesław the Chaste and Leszek the Black 
Campaigns against Yotvingians and Lithuanians were also conducted in the years 1248-1282 by princes Bolesław the Chaste and Leszek the Black. They defeated the forces of pagans invading Mazovia, Kujawy and the Lublin region. They also carried out several expeditions to Yotvingian territories.

Teutonic Order
The Northern Crusades provided a rationale for the growth and expansion of the Teutonic Order of German crusading knights which had been founded in Palestine at the end of the 12th century. Duke Konrad I of Masovia in west-central Poland appealed to the Knights to defend his borders and subdue the pagan Old Prussians in 1226. Already in 1234, a great expedition began, in which the Polish forces of Konrad of Mazovia and the Teutonic Knights defeated the Old Prussians in the battle on the Dzierzgoń river. After the subjugation of the Prussians, the Teutonic Knights fought against the Grand Duchy of Lithuania.

When the Livonian knights were crushed by Samogitians and Semigallians in the Battle of Saule in 1236, coinciding with a series of revolts in Estonia, the Livonian Order was inherited by the Teutonic Order, allowing the Teutonic Knights to exercise political control over large territories in the Baltic region. Mindaugas, the King of Lithuania, was baptised together with his wife after his coronation in 1253, hoping that this would help stop the Crusaders' attacks, which it did not. The Teutonic Knights failed to subdue Lithuania, which officially converted to (Catholic) Christianity in 1386 on the marriage of Grand Duke Jogaila to the 11-year-old Queen Jadwiga of Poland. However, even after the country was officially converted, the conflict continued up until the 1410 Battle of Grunwald, also known as the First Battle of Tannenberg, when the Lithuanians and Poles, helped by the Tatars, Moldovans and the Czechs, defeated the Teutonic Knights.

In 1221, Pope Honorius III was again worried about the situation in the Finnish-Novgorodian Wars after receiving alarming information from the Archbishop of Uppsala. He authorized the Bishop of Finland to establish a trade embargo against the "barbarians" that threatened the Christianity in Finland. The nationality of the "barbarians", presumably a citation from Archbishop's earlier letter, remains unknown, and was not necessarily known even by the Pope. However, as the trade embargo was widened eight years later, it was specifically said to be against the Russians. Based on Papal letters from 1229, the Bishop of Finland requested, the Pope enforce a trade embargo against Novgorodians on the Baltic Sea, at least in Visby, Riga and Lübeck. A few years later, the Pope also requested the Livonian Brothers of the Sword send troops to protect Finland. Whether any knights ever arrived remains unknown.

The Teutonic Order's attempts to conquer Orthodox Russia (particularly the Republics of Pskov and Novgorod), an enterprise endorsed by Pope Gregory IX, accompanied the Northern Crusades. One of the major blows for the idea of the conquest of Russia was the Battle of the Ice in 1242. With or without the Pope's blessing, Sweden also undertook several crusades against Orthodox Novgorod.

Wars against the Rus
Livonian missionary and crusade activity in Estonia caused conflicts with Novgorod, who had also attempted to subjugate, raid and convert the pagan Estonians. The Estonians also sometimes attempted to ally with the Russians against the Crusaders.

Wars between the two sides continued intermittently on several occasions, and halted the eastward expansion of the Teutonic Order, but Novgorodian attempt to take Estonia and Livonia also failed, and the area was firmly dominated by Teutonic Order.

Swedish–Novgorodian Wars
Finnish–Novgorodian wars
Livonian campaign against Rus'
Battle on the Ice
Battle of Wesenberg

See also
Ostsiedlung
Swedish Crusades (disambiguation)
Danish Estonia
History of Belarus
History of Estonia
History of Finland
History of Latvia
History of Lithuania
Christianization of Lithuania

External links
Northern Crusades, article about the crusades from Ancient History Encyclopedia

References

 
Christianization of Europe
History of Christianity in Estonia
13th century in Lithuania
History of Poland during the Piast dynasty
Christian terminology
12th century in Europe
13th century in Europe
Military history of the Teutonic Order
Persecution of Pagans